Nectandra truxillensis (also called laurel mapurito) is a species of plant in the family Lauraceae. It is endemic to Venezuela.

References

truxillensis
Endemic flora of Venezuela
Near threatened plants
Taxa named by Carl Meissner
Taxonomy articles created by Polbot